Prince Moses Mumba is a Zambian former track and field athlete who specialized in the 800 meters. He competed for Zambia at the 2004 and the 2012 Summer Olympics. Mumba participated in three IAAF World Championships in Athletics, in 2005, 2009, and 2011. Additionally, he also represented Zambia in two All Africa Games in 2007 and 2011. He works as track and field coach at the Windward School in Mar Vista, California. Mumba was the flagbearer for Zambia at the 2012 Summer Olympics Opening and Closing Ceremonies. He was born in Kitwe, Zambia.

By the age of 18, Mumba had competed in the 2002 Commonwealth Games and in the 2002 World Junior Championships in Athletics. He then was recruited by Oral Roberts University, where he was a track standout. Mumba is a member of the Oral Roberts University Hall of Fame. After college, he took up athletics professionally with Santa Monica Track Club.

In 2016 he was featured in a commercial called "HOPE" for Footlocker's "Real Lives x Real Runners" campaign, and a movie is currently being developed on his life. The feature film will be directed by Ashley Avis, and produced by Cary Granat, Michael Flaherty, and Edward Winters.

Competition record

References

External links

1984 births
Living people
People from Kitwe
Zambian male middle-distance runners
Athletes (track and field) at the 2004 Summer Olympics
Athletes (track and field) at the 2012 Summer Olympics
Olympic athletes of Zambia
Commonwealth Games competitors for Zambia
Athletes (track and field) at the 2002 Commonwealth Games
Athletes (track and field) at the 2014 Commonwealth Games
World Athletics Championships athletes for Zambia
Track and field athletes from California
Athletes (track and field) at the 2003 All-Africa Games
Athletes (track and field) at the 2007 All-Africa Games
Athletes (track and field) at the 2011 All-Africa Games
African Games competitors for Zambia